Michael Learns to Rock
MLTR (album)
My Life as a Teenage Robot